Joseph Ukel Garang Wel (1932 – 28 July 1971) was a southern Sudanese politician in the 1960s.

Education and career 
Garang attended St. Antony's Bussere (1944–1948) and Rumbek Secondary School (1949–1953). In 1957, he became the first South Sudanese male to obtain a law degree upon his graduating from the Faculty of Law at the University of Khartoum in Sudan. Shortly after graduation, he declined an offer to become a chief justice. Instead, Garang wanted to practice as an attorney and focus on his political career.

Political involvement 
He was a member of the Sudanese Communist Party, and served as Minister of Southern Affairs in the Sudanese Government.

In July 1971, Garang and several others were executed after being convicted as conspirators in the short-lived coup that toppled the regime of President Gaafar Nimeiry.

References

1971 deaths
South Sudanese politicians
Sudanese Communist Party politicians
Government ministers of Sudan
Executed Sudanese people
20th-century executions by Sudan
People executed by Sudan by hanging
Sudanese lawyers
1932 births
20th-century lawyers
Executed communists